Derobrachus inaequalis is a species of beetle in the family Cerambycidae. It was described by Henry Walter Bates in 1872.

References

Prioninae
Beetles described in 1872